Oakford is the name of several locations:

Australia
 Oakford, Western Australia, a suburb of Perth

United Kingdom
 Oakford, Ceredigion, a village in Wales
 Oakford, Devon, a village in England

United States
 Oakford, Illinois
 Oakford, Indiana
 Oakford, Pennsylvania
 Oakford Park (Tampa), Florida, a neighborhood
 Oakford Park, a former amusement park in Jeannette, Pennsylvania
 Oakford Precinct, Menard County, Illinois